Iridopteridales is an order of the extinct cladoxylopsids.  It contains the genus Ibyka which is a possible ancestor of the  horsetails.

References

Fern orders
Prehistoric plant orders